The Fiat A.22 was an Italian water-cooled aircraft engine from the 1920s. It produced 425 kW (570 hp) and powered several absolute world distance records as well as commercial passenger flights.

Design and development
During the second half of the 1920s Fiat introduced several water-cooled aircraft engines, including the A.20, A.22, A24, A.25 and A.30.  They were all upright V-12s with 60° between the cylinder banks; capacities ranged between 18.7 L and 54.5 L (1,141-3,326 cu in) and power outputs between 320 kW and 745 kW (430-1,000 hp).

Producing 425 kW (570 hp) from 27.5 L (1,678 cu in), the A.22 was towards the middle of these ranges. When Fiat were advised by the government to simplify their water-cooled product line, they focussed on the A.20, A.22 and A.30 models.  The A.22 was first run in 1926 and a "few hundred" were built.

The A.22 was developed into the Fiat AS.2 and AS.3 Schneider Trophy race engines.

Operational history
The A.22 was best known for its contribution to some world long distance record flights made by the single engine landplane Savoia-Marchetti S.64, which used the specially adapted A.22 T. version.  Between 31 May and 2 June 1928 this aircraft flew non-stop for  7,665 km (4,763 mi) to capture the world closed circuit distance record.  The flight lasted 58 hr 34 min; the two crew, Capt. Arturo Ferrarin and Major Del Prete took turns as pilot.  A month later, the same crew set a new world straight-line distance record of 7,187 km (4,467 mi), flying from Italy to Brazil in 47 hr 55 min. The closed circuit record was later taken by the French but a slightly revised S.64bis recovered it for Italy with a distance of 8,187 km (5,088 mi) flown in 67 hr 13 min on 31 May-2 June 1930.

The A.22R powered more conventional, airline, flights in a Savoia-Marchetti S.66 three engine flying boat operated by Ala Littoria on the Rome-Cagliari-Tripoli and Rome-Athens-Alexandria routes.

Variants

From Jane's all the World's Aircraft 1938
A.22 un-geared, compression ratio 5.5:1.
A.22 R. (R - Riduttori - reduction gear) Geared 0.5:1, compression ratio 5.5:1.
A.22 S.High compression, compression ratio 6:1.
A.22 AQ. (AQ - Alta Quota - high altitude) Direct drive, compression ratio 7.5:1.
A.22 AQ.R. (AQ.R. - Alta Quota Riduttori - high altitude geared) High altitude 0.5:1 geared engine, compression ratio 7.5:1.
A.22 T. Special version for Savoia-Marchetti S.64.

Applications
From Thompson
 Savoia-Marchetti S.55
 Savoia-Marchetti S.64
 Savoia-Marchetti S.66

Specifications (A.22 R.)

See also

References

1920s aircraft piston engines
A.22